Ernest Brian Trubshaw, CBE, MVO (29 January 1924 – 24 March 2001) was a leading test pilot, and the first British pilot to fly Concorde, in April 1969.

Biography

Brian Trubshaw was born in Liverpool in 1924 although he grew up in Llanelli where his grandfather had married into a family that owned the Western Tinplate Works, later managed by his father Harold (Major H E Trubshaw). He was educated at Winchester College.

He signed up for the RAF in 1942 at the age of eighteen and went to the United States, where he trained as a pilot flying Stearman biplanes. He joined Bomber Command in 1944, flying Stirlings and Lancasters, transferring a year later to Transport Command.

After the end of the Second World War, he joined the King's Flight, piloting George VI and other members of the Royal Family. Then in 1949-50 he taught at the Empire Flying School and the Royal Air Force College Cranwell.

Trubshaw then went to Malaya when he was given permission to leave the RAF (Flight Lieutenant Trubshaw retired from the RAF at his own request on 21 May 1950) to take up a role as test pilot for Vickers Armstrongs, where he remained for 30 years; he succeeded G R 'Jock' Bryce as chief test pilot by 1964, and was director of test flighting from 1966. Trubshaw worked on the development of the Valiant V-bomber, the Vanguard, the VC10, and the BAC One-Eleven, and test flew all of these.

He shot to public attention when he first flew Concorde on 9 April 1969 on a flight from Filton to its test base at RAF Fairford. He emerged from Concorde 002's futuristic cockpit with the words: "It was wizard - a cool, calm and collected operation."  Weeks earlier he had piloted an early test flight of the identical French prototype Concorde 001, commanded by André Turcat. Trubshaw and Turcat were both awarded the Ivan C. Kincheloe Award in 1971, for their work on Concorde.

He was appointed a Member of the Royal Victorian Order in 1948. He was awarded the OBE in 1964 and the CBE in 1970 and was awarded the French Aeronautical Medal in 1976. He ended his career as divisional director and general manager of the Filton works of British Aerospace from 1980 to 1986. From 1986 to 1993 he was a member of the board of the Civil Aviation Authority, and worked as an aviation consultant. He authored books on aviation, notably Concorde: The Inside Story.

A burly, extrovert figure, Trubshaw added golf to his abiding interest in cricket, and later became involved in equestrianism. He was for some years a fence judge at Badminton Horse Trials.

He married Yvonne Edmondson, née Clapham, in 1972.

He died peacefully in his sleep on 24 March 2001, at his home in Cherington, Gloucestershire.

In 1998, Trubshaw was inducted into the International Air & Space Hall of Fame at the San Diego Air & Space Museum.

See also
 John Cochrane

External links
Brian Trubshaw, Concorde and the Llanelli Connection

References

1924 births
2001 deaths
BAC One-Eleven
British Aircraft Corporation
British aviators
British test pilots
British World War II pilots
British World War II bomber pilots
Commanders of the Order of the British Empire
Concorde pilots
English cricketers
Harmon Trophy winners
Members of the Royal Victorian Order
People educated at Winchester College
Military personnel from Liverpool
People from Llanelli
People from Tetbury
Royal Air Force cricketers
Royal Air Force officers
Segrave Trophy recipients
Sportspeople from Gloucestershire